Cory Wade Burns (born October 9, 1987) is an American former professional baseball pitcher. He previously played in Major League Baseball (MLB) for the San Diego Padres, and Texas Rangers and Lancaster Barnstormers of the independent Atlantic League of Professional Baseball.

Professional career

Cleveland Indians
Burns was drafted by the Cleveland Indians in the eighth round of the 2009 Major League Baseball Draft out of the University of Arizona.

San Diego Padres
He was traded to the San Diego Padres on December 16, 2011, for Aaron Cunningham.

The Padres called Burns up to the majors for the first time on August 3, 2012, and sent him down to the Tucson Padres on August 5. He was recalled on August 11 when Huston Street was placed on the disabled list.

Texas Rangers
Burns was acquired by the Texas Rangers on November 28, 2012, and split the 2013 season between the Rangers and the Triple-A Round Rock Express. Wilfredo Boscán was sent to the Padres on December 6 to complete the trade.

Tampa Bay Rays
Burns was claimed off waivers by the Tampa Bay Rays on June 30, 2014, and optioned to the Double-A Montgomery Biscuits. He also played for the Triple-A Durham Bulls in 2014.

Toronto Blue Jays
Burns was claimed off waivers by the Toronto Blue Jays on September 28, 2014. He was designated for assignment on January 14, 2015, and outrighted to the Triple-A Buffalo Bisons on January 16. He was assigned to the Double-A New Hampshire Fisher Cats on April 2. Burns elected free agency on November 6, 2015.

Lancaster Barnstormers
On March 15, 2016, Burns signed with the Lancaster Barnstormers of the Atlantic League of Professional Baseball.

New York Mets
In December 2016, Burns signed a minor league contract with the New York Mets. He elected free agency on November 6, 2017.

References

External links

Arizona Wildcats bio

1987 births
Living people
Baseball players from Phoenix, Arizona
Major League Baseball pitchers
San Diego Padres players
Texas Rangers players
Arizona Wildcats baseball players
Mahoning Valley Scrappers players
Lake County Captains players
Kinston Indians players
Akron Aeros players
Tucson Padres players
Round Rock Express players
Phoenix Desert Dogs players
Montgomery Biscuits players
Durham Bulls players
New Hampshire Fisher Cats players
Lancaster Barnstormers players
Las Vegas 51s players
Binghamton Rumble Ponies players